Miniopterus macrocneme is a bat in the genus Miniopterus. It is found primarily in the Loyalty Islands of New Caledonia, though it is also found in New Guinea. It has been considered a subspecies of Miniopterus pusillus in recent years. It lives in caves in large numbers, though it can also be found in forests.

References

Further reading
Flannery, T.F. 1995. Mammals of New Guinea. Chatswood, New South Wales: Reed Books, 568 pp.
Flannery, T.F. 1995. Mammals of the South-West Pacific & Moluccan Islands. Chatswood: Reed Books, 464 pp.  

Miniopteridae
Mammals described in 1914
Bats of Oceania